LaQuinton Ross (born November 18, 1991) is an American professional basketball player for Pallacanestro Mantovana of the Italian Serie A2. He played college basketball for the Ohio State Buckeyes before declaring for the 2014 NBA draft.

High school career
Ross attended Murrah High School in Jackson, Mississippi for two years then transferred to Life Center Academy in Burlington, New Jersey where he averaged a total of 25.3 points and 11.3 rebounds per game as a senior.

College career
Ross' commitment to the Ohio State University was delayed due an investigation by the NCAA regarding his academic eligibility, joining the team on December 11, 2011. Later on December 22, Ross made his first appearance of his inaugural year by adding 5 points vs Miami University.  After the freshman season, Ross played in all 37 games of the 2012–13 season. Included in Ross' 2012–13 campaign was a 22-point game versus Northern Kentucky University on December 1, a 15-point breakout versus Chicago State, and another 16-point performance versus Michigan on February 5. Overall, during Ross' 2012–13 season, he acquired a total of 8.3 points per game and a field goal percentage of 46.8%, an improvement from his 2.0 points per game and 33.3% field goal percentage during his freshmen year. During the 2013 NCAA Tournament, Ross scored the game-winning 3-point shoot off a pass from Ohio State teammate Aaron Craft which subsequently led to Ohio State's advancement to the Elite Eight. In the next tournament game, Ross scored 19 points in 22 minutes during a 70–66 loss to the Wichita State Shockers. Later, during his 2013–14 season, Ross totaled 15.2 points, 5.9 rebounds, and a 44.7 field goal percentage.

In March 2014, Ross declared for the NBA draft, forgoing his final year of college eligibility.

Professional career
After going undrafted in the 2014 NBA draft, Ross joined the Los Angeles Lakers for the 2014 NBA Summer League. On August 9, 2014, he signed with VL Pesaro of the Italian Serie A for the 2014–15 season.

On June 30, 2015, Ross joined the Charlotte Hornets for the Orlando Summer League and the Washington Wizards for the Las Vegas Summer League. On July 27, 2015, he signed with Pallacanestro Cantù, again of the Serie A, for the 2015–16 season. On January 5, 2016, he left Cantù and signed with Hapoel Eilat of the Israeli Premier League. In November 2016, he parted ways with Eilat. On January 4, 2017, he signed with French club JDA Dijon Basket for the rest of 2016–17 Pro A season. On January 25, 2017, he parted ways with Dijon before appearing in a game for them. Six days later, he signed with Club Malvín of the Liga Uruguaya de Basketball.

In 2017, he played two games with the Texas Legends of the NBA G League. On February 1, 2018, he signed in Argentina with Quimsa of the Liga Nacional de Básquet. After being selected in the 2018 NBA G League draft, Ross joined the Northern Arizona Suns for training camp. In 2020, he signed with Los Prados de Santo Domingo in the Dominican Republic.

On August 16, 2021, he has signed with Zlatibor of the Basketball League of Serbia. In April 2022, Zlatibor won the ABA League Second Division for the 2021–22 season following a 78–73 overtime win over MZT Skopje Aerodrom.

On August 4, 2022, he has signed with Pallacanestro Mantovana of the Italian Serie A2.

Career statistics

Domestic leagues

References

External links
Ohio State bio
RealGM profile

1991 births
Living people
American expatriate basketball people in China
American expatriate basketball people in Israel
American expatriate basketball people in Italy
American expatriate basketball people in Serbia
American expatriate basketball people in Uruguay
American men's basketball players
Basketball League of Serbia players
Basketball players from Jackson, Mississippi
Hapoel Eilat basketball players
KK Zlatibor players
Lega Basket Serie A players
Life Center Academy alumni
Northern Arizona Suns players
Ohio State Buckeyes men's basketball players
Pallacanestro Cantù players
Shooting guards
Small forwards
Texas Legends players
Victoria Libertas Pallacanestro players